George Leon Smith II (November 27, 1912 – December 9, 1973) was an American politician in the state of Georgia.

Smith was born in Stillmore, Georgia in 1912, and attended the University of Georgia. Admitted to the Georgia bar in 1932, he was an attorney and served as City Attorney of Swainsboro, Georgia before his election to the Georgia House of Representatives  in 1944. He served as the speaker of that body on two occasions, from 1959 to 1962, and from 1967 until his death in office from a stroke in 1973.

George L. Smith State Park near Twin City, Georgia is named in his honor.

References

1912 births
1973 deaths
Members of the Georgia House of Representatives
20th-century American politicians